The 2021–22 VCU Rams men's basketball team represented Virginia Commonwealth University during the 2021–22 NCAA Division I men's basketball season. They are led by fifth-year head coach is Mike Rhoades and played their home games at the Siegel Center in Richmond, Virginia as a member of the Atlantic 10 Conference. They finished the season 22–10, 14–4 in A-10 play to finish in a tie for second place. As the No. 3 seed in the A-10 tournament, they lost in the quarterfinals to Richmond. They received an at-large bid to the National Invitation Tournament where they defeated Princeton in the first round before losing to Wake Forest.

Previous season
In a season limited due to the ongoing COVID-19 pandemic, the Rams finished the 2020–21 season 19–7, 10–4 in A-10 play to finish in second place. In the A-10 tournament, they defeated Dayton and Davidson to advance to the championship game where they lost to St. Bonaventure. VCU received an at-large berth to the NCAA tournament as the No. 10 seed in the West region. Due to several positive COVID-19 tests in the VCU program prior to their First Round game against Oregon, the game was declared a no-contest and Oregon advanced to the Second Round, making VCU the first team ever to forfeit a game in the NCAA tournament.

Offseason

Departures

Incoming transfers

2021 recruiting class

Preseason

A-10 media poll
The Atlantic 10 men's basketball media poll will be released in October or November 2021.

Roster

Schedule and results

|-
!colspan=12 style=| Exhibition

|-
!colspan=12 style=| Non-conference regular season

|-
!colspan=12 style=|Atlantic 10 regular season
|-

|-
!colspan=12 style=|Atlantic 10 tournament

|-
!colspan=12 style=|NIT
|-

|-

References

External links
 VCU Basketball

VCU
VCU Rams men's basketball seasons
VCU Rams men's basketball
VCU Rams men's basketball
VCU Rams men's basketball
VCU Rams men's basketball
VCU